The 2021 Tour of Romania was a six-day cycling stage race that took place in Romania in August and September 2021. The race was the 54th edition of the Tour of Romania. The tour was rated as a 2.1 event, as part of the 2021 UCI Europe Tour.

Jakub Kaczmarek became the second Polish rider to win the Tour of Romania after Daniel Zigmund in 1935.

Route

Teams
Twenty teams were invited to start the race. Sixteen gave a positive answer: one UCI ProTeam, twelve UCI Continental Teams and three national teams.

Stages

Prologue 
31 August 2021 — Timișoara,  (ITT)

Stage 1 
1 September 2021 — Timișoara to Deva,

Stage 2 
2 September 2021 — Deva to Păltiniș,

Stage 3 
3 September 2021 — Sibiu to Poiana Brașov,

Stage 4 
4 September 2021 — Brașov to Bucharest,

Stage 5 
5 September 2021 — Bucharest,

Classification leadership table

Standings

General classification

Points classification

Mountains classification

Young rider classification

Best Romanian rider classification

Team classification

See also

 2021 in men's road cycling
 2021 in sports

References

External links

2021 UCI Europe Tour
2021 in Romanian sport
2021
Tour of Romania